Rajeev Taranath (born 17 October 1932) is an Indian classical musician who plays the sarod. Taranath is a disciple of Ali Akbar Khan.

Career
Rajeev Taranath was born in Bangalore on 17 October 1932. He received his initial training in vocal music from his father Pandit Taranath. He gave his first public vocal performance when he was nine years old. Rajeev was singing for the All India Radio before he was twenty.

Although Rajeev held a PhD in literature, he decided to give up his career as a Professor and Head of English Literature at Regional Engineering College, Tiruchirappalli (REC-T), which was later renamed as National Institute of Technology, Tiruchirappalli (NIT-T), and then went to Calcutta, where he began his musical training under the tutelage of Ali Akbar Khan. Rajeev continued to learn from his Guru till Khan's demise in 2009. He has also had guidance from Ravi Shankar, Annapurna Devi, Nikhil Banerjee and Aashish Khan. He has received some of India's highest national honors including the 2019 Padma Sri award and the Sangeet Natak Akademi in 1999-2000. He researched and published the Teaching Techniques of the Maihar-Allauddin Gharana, as a Ford Foundation scholar (1989 to 1992).

He is respected for his in-depth understanding as he unfolds the raga, the tonal quality and power of his strokes. His distinctive style shows technical excellence, imaginative power and emotional range. According to the New York Times, "RAJEEV TARANATH'S sarod improvisations Sunday at Soundscape mixed the spiritual and the spirited".

Rajeev performs extensively in India and the world. He has toured Australia, Europe, Yemen, the United States, and Canada. He has composed the music for many internationally acclaimed Indian films including Samskara, Kanchana Sita and Kadavu. He has also served as the head of the Indian music program at the World Music Department of the California Institute of the Arts from 1995 to 2005.
He currently lives and teaches in Mysore, Karnataka.

Rajeev Taranth taught English literature at the University of Aden in 1980s. He was the subject of a documentary made for the television in Aden entitled "Fannan Min-Al-Hind" (Artist from India).

Discography 
Taranath has several recordings published:
 In concert: Raga Bageshri Kanada, Manj Khammaj and Bhairavi (IMPU 2020)
 Hamdard - Puriya Dhanshri, Chandrandan(Bihaan Records 2015)
 Prism - Gaur Sarang, Madhuvanti, Bhairavi(Bihaan Records 2014)
 Swar Kalyan (Navras Records 2011)
 Sandhya (Bihaan Records2011)
Manan "Meditation": Ragas Bihag and Bhairavi (Navras Records 2008)
Harmony: Sindhu Bhairavi Raagmala (2007)
Raga Kafi: Some Facets (2007)
Rasarang (2004)
Reflections Around Noon : Ragas Todi and Kafi (2003)
The Call of Love, The Art of Persian and Indian Improvisations (2002)
Daybreak and a Candle End (2002)
Indian Classical Music (2001)
Rag Nat Bhairo, Rag Kaushi Bhairavi, Bhairavi (1995) 
Over the Moon : Raga Chandranandan (1993)
Raga Ahir Bhairav/Raga Charukeshi (1991)
The Magnificence of Yaman Kalyan (1987)
In the Master's Tradition : Rag Basant Mukhari, Rag Kirwani (1987)
Rag Kafi  
Rag Komal Durga  
Rag Puriya Dhanashri

Awards and recognitions 
 Basavashree Award, 2021
 S.V. Narayanarao Memorial National Award, 2020
 Padma Shri, 2019
 Nadoja Award from Kannada University, 2018
 Sangeet Vidhwan Award,2018
The Sangeet Natak Akademi Award, 1999–2000
Sangeetha Rathna Mysore T. Chowdiah Memorial Award 1998 (Government of Karnataka, India)
Sangeet Nritya Akademi Award, 1993
Karnataka Rajya Prashasti, 1996
Kempe Gowda Award, 2006
Sangeet Kalaratna from the Gayana Samaja
Jyothi Subramanya Award
Brahmaramba N Nagaraja Rao Gold Medal
V T Srinivasan Memorial Award

References

External links 

True to A Lineage - Friday Review of The Hindu 2013

New York Times Review
 Interview in India Currents Magazine 2018
Concert Review in The Hindu newspaper 2006
 Article in The Hindu 2007
Interview by Kavita Chhibber

Article in The Hindu 2007
Concert review Los Angeles Times
Interview in Deccan Herald Newspaper 2005
Article – Celebrating Taranath's Birthday
Article in The Hindu – Strings of Success 2011
Article in the Star of Mysore newspaper 2010
Press release on University of Mysore Honorary Doctorate 2010
Article – Book on Rajeev Taranath's life on bestseller list
Article – Concert in Shimoga 2010

1932 births
Hindustani instrumentalists
Indian film score composers
Living people
Maihar gharana
Musicians from Bangalore
Recipients of the Sangeet Natak Akademi Award
Sarod players
20th-century Indian musicians
Indian male musicians
Indian male film score composers
20th-century male musicians
Recipients of the Padma Shri in arts